Samrat Vikramaditya Government Law College, Ujjain is a government college affiliated to Vikram University in the center of Ujjain, India. The college offers 160 LL.B seats and 30 LL.M seats annually. According to the institute's website, it is not accredited by the Bar Council of India & National Assessment and Accreditation Council (NAAC) nor registered with the University Grants Commission (UGC).

References

External links
 

Law schools in Madhya Pradesh
Education in Ujjain
2014 establishments in Madhya Pradesh
Educational institutions established in 2014